John H. Baker may refer to:

John Harris Baker (1832–1915), American politician from Indiana
John Holland Baker (1841–1930), New Zealand surveyor and public servant
John Baker (legal historian) (John Hamilton Baker, born 1944), English legal historian

See also
John Baker (disambiguation)